Sonkád is a village in Szabolcs-Szatmár-Bereg county, in the Northern Great Plain region of eastern Hungary.

Geography

Sightseeings
The old church built in gothic style in the 15th century can be visited. It has beautiful ceiling cassette roof.

Outer links
Detailed description about the reformed church of Sonkád.

Populated places in Szabolcs-Szatmár-Bereg County